Wooden Crosses is a 1932 French war film by Raymond Bernard, based upon a novel by Roland Dorgelès.

Plot
Patriotic student Demachy enlists in the French army in 1914 at the start of World War I. He and his comrades soon experience the terrifying, endless trench war in Champagne, where more and more wooden crosses have to be erected for this cannon fodder.

Cast (in credits order)
 Pierre Blanchar as Adjudant Gilbert Demachy
 Gabriel Gabrio as Sulphart
 Charles Vanel as Caporal Breval
 Raymond Aimos as Soldat Fouillard
 Antonin Artaud as Soldat Vieuble
 Paul Azaïs as Soldat Broucke
 René Bergeron as Soldat Hamel
 Raymond Cordy as Soldat Vairon
 Marcel Delaitre as Sergent Berthier
 Jean Galland as Capitaine Cruchet
 Pierre Labry as Soldat Bouffioux, Le Cuistot
 Geo Laby as Soldat Belin
 René Montis as Lieutenant Morache
 Jean-François Martial as Soldat Lemoine
 Marc Valbel as Maroux

References

External links
 
 
 

1932 films
French black-and-white films
1930s war drama films
French war drama films
Western Front (World War I) films
Films directed by Raymond Bernard
Films based on French novels
1932 drama films
1930s French films